Virinder Singh Kalra (born March 1967) is an Indian-British sociologist and Professor at the University of Warwick whose research interests  include Gramscianism, popular culture, South Asian diaspora and racism in the United Kingdom. He was a senior lecturer and then Professor in Sociology at the University of Manchester.

Publications 

 From Textile Mills to Taxi Ranks (2000)
 Diaspora and Hybridity (2005)
 A Postcolonial People (2006)
 Pakistani Diasporas: Culture, Conflict, and Change (2008)
 Sacred and Secular Musics: A Postcolonial Approach (2014)
 State of Subversion: Radical Politics in Punjab in the 20th Century (2016)
 Beyond Religion in India and Pakistan: Gender and Caste, Borders and Boundaries (2019)

References

Living people
1967 births
Alumni of the University of Manchester